Michael Ball, Jr. (born August 5, 1964) is a former professional American football player who played safety for six seasons for the Indianapolis Colts, from 1988–1993.

References

1964 births
Living people
Players of American football from New Orleans
American football safeties
Southern Jaguars football players
Indianapolis Colts players